Leon Mercer Jordan (May 6, 1905 – July 15, 1970) was an African-American civil rights leader who served in the Missouri House of Representatives. Jordan was "one of the most influential African Americans in Kansas City's history" and, at the time of his assassination in 1970, the "state's most powerful black politician".

Early years
Leon Jordan attended Lincoln High School in Kansas City, Missouri, served in the United States Army, and graduated from Wilberforce University in Ohio in 1933. He married fellow Wilberforce student Orchid Irene Ramsey on August 10, 1932.

Career
After graduation, Jordan worked as a schoolteacher.

He joined the Kansas City Police Department (KCPD) in 1938, rising to the rank of detective. He took a leave of absence in 1947 and spent eight years training the police forces of Liberia. As a pilot, Jordan flew his own plane around the country. In 1948, he helped coordinate the rescue of the French High Commissioner of West Africa and sixteen other French officials after their plane made a forced landing. Jordan was awarded the Chevalier of the Order of the African Star by Liberian President William Tubman in 1948.

In 1951, Jordan became a life member of the National Association for the Advancement of Colored People (NAACP). He returned to Kansas City in February 1952 and was promoted to police lieutenant, the first African-American to hold that rank in the KCPD's history. However, he discovered that he had little power in the department, so he resigned and went back to Liberia for three years. Jordan returned to Kansas City permanently in the mid-1950s and purchased the Green Duck Tavern.

Civil rights and politics

In 1958, Jordan became a Democratic committeeman for the 14th Ward of Kansas City. In 1962, Jordan and Bruce R. Watkins co-founded Freedom, Inc., an organization which advocated political awareness among African-Americans in the city by organizing a massive voter registration drive and promoting black political candidates. In 1963, Jordan and Watkins helped pass an accommodations ordinance, desegregating all public facilities in Kansas City.

In 1964, Freedom, Inc. put forward eight candidates for office, seven of which won. Among them was Jordan, who was elected to the first of three terms in the Missouri House of Representatives. Jordan was campaigning for a fourth term at the time he was murdered. Shortly before his death, he described himself as a "radical", adding, "I'm not a conformist but there are bounds of reason."

Assassination
At about 1:00 a.m. on July 15, 1970, Jordan was killed just outside his Green Duck Tavern by three shotgun blasts. Eyewitnesses reported that the three killers were African-American. The shotgun had been stolen and was abandoned immediately. When it was recovered, it was traced to a burglary five years earlier in Independence, Missouri. Three men were arrested for the murder, including at least one affiliated with a criminal group called the "Black Mafia". One man was acquitted, and charges were dropped against the other two suspects.

Upon his death, his widow, Orchid I. Jordan, became a candidate for his legislative seat. She won the election, and served for sixteen years in the Missouri House of Representatives. She died on December 25, 1995, at the age of 85.

Murder weapon
Jordan was killed using a Remington 12-gauge Wingmaster shotgun, which was one of several firearms that had been stolen from a hardware store in Independence in 1965. A January 1966 report on the burglary by the Independence Police Department stated that the guns had later been sold through a "North End Italian fence". This report was not discovered in the initial investigation of Jordan's murder, but was uncovered by investigative journalists working for the Kansas City Star in 2010. When the reporters asked the KCPD about the shotgun, they were told that it had been lost in 1973. The shotgun may have been sold in a police surplus auction. Some time later, the KCPD purchased the used shotgun from a gun store and did not check the serial number. The shotgun was refurbished and placed into police service.

On November 5, 1997, a police officer used the shotgun to shoot and wound an armed suspect in North Kansas City. The weapon was analyzed by the crime lab, who failed to identify it as the Jordan murder weapon, and it was returned to police service the following year. Only when the Star asked questions about the missing shotgun in 2010 did a crime lab technician run a computer check that located the gun, which was recovered from the trunk of a police car and then returned to the evidence room.

2010 investigation
In 2010, Kansas City Star reporters began investigating the assassination while preparing for coverage of the 40th anniversary of Jordan's death. This led to discovery of the missing murder weapon and some old fingerprint cards, which persuaded the KCPD to re-open their investigation into the department's oldest cold case. Civil rights leader Alvin Sykes pressed the KCPD for a complete investigation. In trying to determine who was responsible for the assassination, the Star reported that Jordan and Freedom, Inc. had been opposed to the "North End" faction in Kansas City politics, a group under the influence of the Italian-American Mafia which had previously controlled black voting blocs. In 1965, Jordan had punched Frank Mazzuca, a fellow state legislator who was alleged to have supported mob interests in Jefferson City, and reportedly faced death threats in the aftermath.

The Star reported that police informants associated with the Black Mafia had described the killing as a favor to North End mob interests, and that it was organized by "Shotgun Joe" Centimano, owner of a local liquor store. The informants claimed that Centimano had supplied the murder weapon and recruited the killers. The Star further reported that one informant stated the assassination had elements of both a "contract killing" and a "revenge killing", and that another said it was "all about politics". News coverage referred to a 900-page police report finished in 2011 which concluded that mob boss Nicholas Civella had given his "blessing" to Jordan's assassination. No one was indicted because all of the alleged perpetrators were dead by then.

Legacy
The Leon M. Jordan Memorial Park, located at 31st Street and Benton Boulevard in Kansas City, features a statue of Jordan and a plaque on the front of its base.

Jordan's papers, including extensive documentation of his service in Liberia, are collected in the library of the University of Missouri's Kansas City campus. He is the topic of a documentary called A Legacy of Leadership, directed by Emiel Cleaver and funded by a 2019 Rocket Grant from the Charlotte Street Foundation. Its release was scheduled for July 2020, in conjunction with the 50th anniversary of Jordan's death.

In 1948, Liberian President William Tubman awarded him Chevalier of the Order of the African Star.

See also
List of assassinated American politicians
List of unsolved murders

References

Further reading

External links
Kansas City, Missouri Police Officers Memorial: Leon Jordan

1905 births
1970 deaths
1970 murders in the United States
20th-century American politicians
African-American aviators
African-American police officers
African-American state legislators in Missouri
Assassinated American civil rights activists
Assassinated American politicians
Aviators from Missouri
Deaths by firearm in Missouri
Male murder victims
Democratic Party members of the Missouri House of Representatives
Military personnel from Missouri
Murdered African-American people
American police officers
NAACP activists
People murdered in Missouri
Politicians from Kansas City, Missouri
Unsolved murders in the United States
Wilberforce University alumni
20th-century African-American politicians
Assassinated American State House representatives